Sunset Alliance Records is an independent record label based in Mesa, Arizona. It is owned and operated by David Jensen.

History
After the release of a couple LPs featuring local rock bands, original owner and founder Steve Lefever had plans to let the label die. Then, in 2000, he approached the then-frontman of Before Braille, Dave Jensen, who had been working for two years to create a compilation album for the benefit of a local Phoenix art house and music venue, Modified Arts, and invited him to join in the management of Sunset Alliance and release that compilation on the label. While Dave Jensen's original plans had been to release that record on his own start-up label, Aireshire Drive, he jumped at the opportunity. In 2001, Dave Jensen took full ownership of the label and has managed it since.

After a decade of operations, Sunset Alliance remains a small enterprise that focuses on local artists. However, this has not kept the little label from attaining some significant national (and even international) success. During those first ten years, Sunset Alliance put out 46 releases, had three bands appear in the popular Emo Diaries series on Deep Elm Records, found its bands charting on the CMJ 200, sent its bands across the U.S. on concert and music festival tours, watched as some of its artists received international praise and released their records in foreign markets, and has even applauded as one of its groups moved on to a major label.

In January 2010, Sunset Alliance celebrated its ten-year anniversary with a revue show featuring some of its most successful bands, including: Before Braille, Fivespeed, The Player Piano, Novi Split, The Letterpress, and special guests Pinewood Derby.

Bands 
This list is compiled from information found on the Sunset Alliance website, as well as through the label's discography.

 Andherson
 Art for Starters
 Before Braille
 The Bled
 Beninem
 Captain Baby
 Corrupt Citizen
 Felix
 52nd Street Jazz Band
 Fivespeed
 Half Visconte
 Jeff Johnrey
 Last Day Parade
 The Letterpress
 Loyal Wife
 The Manhattan Project
 Mr. Fantastical
 The Necronauts
 Novi Split
 The Player Piano
 Rajiv Patel
 Redfield
 Roger Over & Out
 The Retaliation for What They Have Done to Us
 Signedso
 Shotstar
 Stereotyperider
 Tickertape Parade

Discography

References

External links
 Official website

American independent record labels
Indie rock record labels
Record labels based in Arizona
Companies based in Mesa, Arizona
Record labels established in 1999
1999 establishments in Arizona